Nepenthes halmahera is a tropical pitcher plant native to the island of Halmahera, North Maluku, Indonesia. However, the 2018 IUCN assessment found the species to be common in the Weda Bay area. The type specimen used to be regarded as an aberrant representative of N. danseri.

References

Carnivorous plants of Asia
halmahera
Endemic flora of the Maluku Islands
Plants described in 2015
Taxa named by Martin Cheek